Usnic acid is a naturally occurring dibenzofuran derivative found in several lichen species with the formula C18H16O7. It was first isolated by German scientist W. Knop in 1844 and first synthesized between 1933-1937 by Curd and Robertson. Usnic acid was identified in many genera of lichens including Usnea, Cladonia, Hypotrachyna, Lecanora, Ramalina, Evernia, Parmelia and Alectoria. Although it is generally believed that usnic acid is exclusively restricted to lichens, in a few unconfirmed isolated cases the compound was found in kombucha tea and non-lichenized ascomycetes.

At normal conditions, usnic acid is a bitter, yellow, solid substance. It is known to occur in nature in both the d- and l-forms as well as a racemic mixture. Salts of usnic acid are called usnates (e.g. copper usnate).

Biological role in lichens
Usnic acid is a secondary metabolite in lichens whose role has not been completely elucidated. It is believed that usnic acid protects the lichen from adverse effects of sunlight exposure and deters grazing animals with its bitter taste.

Biosynthesis
Usnic acid is a polyketide biosynthesized via methylphloroacetophenone as an intermediate.

Safety
Usnic acid and its salts are idiosyncratically associated with severe hepatotoxicity and liver failure. Daily oral intake of 300–1350 mg over a period of weeks has led to severe hepatotoxicity in a number of persons.

Sodium usniate was one ingredient in a product called "Lipokinetix" that was claimed to induce weight loss via an increase in metabolic rate.  Lipokinetix has been the topic of an FDA warning in the USA due to potential hepatotoxicity, although it is unclear yet if any toxicity would be attributable to the aforementioned salt. Lipokinetix also contained norephedrine (PPA), caffeine, yohimbine and 3,5-diiodothyronine.

Pharmacology
Usnic acid has been found to have adrenergic activity in both frog and earthworm nerve junction models in preliminary research.

Analytics
It is possible to determine the content of usnic acid in lichen extract using reversed-polarity or high performance liquid chromatography. capillary zone electrophoretic analysis.

References

External links
 Seeking to Fight Fat, She Lost Her Liver, New York Times, March 4, 2003

Polyphenols
Organic acids
Dibenzofurans
Ketones
Polyketides
Resorcinols
Lichen products